Tyrant is an American drama television series that premiered on the cable network FX on June 24, 2014. The series follows Bassam "Barry" Al-Fayeed, the youngest son of an infamous Middle-Eastern tyrant, who has been running from his past for 20 years. Now a pediatrician living in the United States, he has an American wife, son and daughter, and has no desire to revisit his familial origins. However, when he is reluctantly compelled to return to his home country (the fictional Abuddin) for his nephew's wedding, he is quickly drawn into a taut political crisis when his father dies in the midst of growing popular revolution against the ruling family. Bassam must now attempt to use his influence to guide the new President, his brutal and unstable older brother Jamal, to a political solution that will avert a bloody conflict.

Series overview

Episodes

Season 1 (2014)

Season 2 (2015)

Season 3 (2016)

Ratings

References

External links
 Episode Guide on FX
 

Lists of American drama television series episodes